"Why Don't We Fall in Love" is a song written and produced by Rich Harrison for American R&B singer Amerie's debut album, All I Have (2002). Released as the album's lead single in the United Kingdom in October 2001 and in the United States in July 2002. After being sent to US Urban/Urban AC, Top 40 and Rhythmic radio in April 2002, the song reached number twenty-three on the Billboard Hot 100 and became a top ten hit on the Hot R&B/Hip-Hop Songs. It performed moderately elsewhere, peaking at number forty in the United Kingdom and number seventy-three in Australia. The song is also used for the promo of the CBS soap opera The Young and the Restless. It is also one of the songs used in the American version of Donkey Konga 2. Part of the lyrics, along with the background music, was sampled in the song "Rule the World" by 2 Chainz and Ariana Grande.

Music video
The single's music video was directed by Benny Boom and featuring guest appearances by Carl Thomas and Tyrese, released in June 2002.

Remixes
The official remix features rapper Ludacris who is also in the CD single and the Japanese edition of the album. There is also a remix called the "Roc-A-Fella Remix" that features Dipset rapper Cam'Ron; another remix also produced by Rich Harrison called the "Richcraft Remix" has new verses by Amerie and a new instrumental. This remix would later appear on her next album Touch as a bonus track for the U.S. and Japanese editions.

Track listings and formats
U.S. double A-side single with "Got to Be There"
"Why Don't We Fall in Love" (album version) – 2:39
"Got to Be There" – 3:01

UK and Australian CD single
"Why Don't We Fall in Love" (album version) – 2:39
"Why Don't We Fall in Love" (main mix featuring Ludacris) – 3:33
"Why Don't We Fall in Love" (Richcraft Remix) – 3:36
"Why Don't We Fall in Love" (instrumental) – 2:48
"Why Don't We Fall in Love" (main mix - a cappella featuring Ludacris) – 3:26

UK 12" single
Side A:
"Why Don't We Fall in Love" (main mix featuring Ludacris) – 3:33
"Why Don't We Fall in Love" (album version) – 2:39
"Why Don't We Fall in Love" (instrumental) – 2:48
Side B:
"Why Don't We Fall in Love" (Richcraft Remix) – 3:36
"Why Don't We Fall in Love" (Richcraft Remix Instrumental) – 3:35

Charts

Year-end charts

References

2002 debut singles
Amerie songs
Ludacris songs
Music videos directed by Benny Boom
Song recordings produced by Rich Harrison
Songs written by Rich Harrison
2002 songs
Columbia Records singles